Séguélon is a town in northwestern Ivory Coast. It is a sub-prefecture of and the seat of Séguélon Department in Kabadougou Region, Denguélé District. Séguélon is also a commune.

In 2014, the population of the sub-prefecture of Séguélon was 15,898.

Villages
The 17 villages of the sub-prefecture of Séguélon and their population in 2014 are:

References

Sub-prefectures of Kabadougou
Communes of Kabadougou